James B. Parramore (January 20, 1840 – February 6, 1902) was an American politician, who was the fourteenth Mayor of Orlando from 1896 to 1902.

Biography
James "Buck" was born in Thomasville, Georgia on January 20, 1840, to Redden and Mary Ann (Tooke) Parramore.  He moved to Madison County, Florida by 1845 and then with his family to Orlando in 1881.

Parramore also served as a captain in the Fourth Florida Infantry of the Confederate States Army during the American Civil War. He died while in office in 1902 at the age of 62, where he was interred at Greenwood Cemetery.

Parramore, a neighborhood in west-central Orlando, Florida was built in the 1880s by James Parramore.

References

Mayors of Orlando, Florida
1840 births
1902 deaths
People from Thomasville, Georgia